The Ibkilwit Lava Bed is a lava bed on Nunivak Island in the U.S. state of Alaska.

Ibkilwit is an Eskimo term that was recorded in 1949. Variations include Ebcyeet, Ibkhikhyit, and Ibxixyit.

Landforms of Bethel Census Area, Alaska